Won't Back Down may refer to:

Songs 
 "Won't Back Down" (Eminem song), 2010
 "Won't Back Down" (Fuel song), 2003

Other uses 
 Won't Back Down (film), a 2012 drama film directed by Daniel Barnz

See also 
 "I Won't Back Down", a song by Tom Petty featured on his first solo album, Full Moon Fever
 "We Won't Back Down", a song by HammerFall on their album (r)Evolution